Orange is a 2018 Indian Kannada-language romantic comedy film directed by Prashant Raj and produced by Naveen starring Ganesh in the lead, making it a second collaboration after Zoom (2016), alongside Priya Anand. The supporting cast features Dev Gill, Sadhu Kokila, Ravishankar Gowda, Rangayana Raghu and Avinash among others. The music is scored by S. Thaman and cinematography is by Santhosh Rai Pathaje.

The film team has shot three songs and few montage scenes across several cities of the Europe continent. The film released across Karnataka on 7 December 2018. The film marks the first ever venture in Kannada cinema to have been acquired by the Amazon Prime prior to its release.

Plot
Santosh is a Robin Hood, who is released from jail where he boards a train for his village. He meets Radha and befriends her and tells him she is in love with her boyfriend Prashanth, but her father HuliVeerayya disapproves. Santhosh leaves the train to catch the thief who stole Radha's bracelet, but Radha misunderstands that Santhosh has reached his destination where she gives his bag and belongings and bid goodbye. Santhosh tries unsuccessfully to find her where he goes to HuliVeerayya's house where the family misunderstands Santhosh to be Radha's lover lets him stay at their house. One day, Radha arrives back and the family fixes her marriage with Santhosh. In the village festival, Narasimha is a gangster who insults HuliVeerayya and tries to trouble Radha, but is saved by Santhosh.

Some comical events occur in home when Prashanth and his family arrive. Radha, who learns about Santhosh's identity falls in love with him. One night, Some thieves barge into HuliVeerayya's house and steals necklaces from the house and Santosh becomes the suspect where he is thrown out of the house. Narasimha starts to trouble Huli again at Radha's marriage. He shows the captured Santosh to instill fear in them. However, HuliVeerayya doesn't budge and insults Santhosh calling him a thief, but Santhosh's grandmother intervenes and reveals that he was stealing money to run an orphanage and old-age home for the poor, needy and depressed people. Santosh awakens and fights Narasimha where he gets him arrested. HuliVeerayya apologize to Santhosh where he unites Santhosh with Radha, leaving Prashanth devastated.

Cast

Ganesh as Santhosh
Priya Anand as Radha
Dev Gill as Narasimha Nayaka
Sadhu Kokila as Kodanda
Rangayana Raghu as Giddappa
Avinash as Huli Veeraiah
Harish Raj as Prashanth, Giddappa's son
Joy Badlani
Padmaja Rao as Radha's mother
Meghana Khushi as Rukmini, Radha's sister
Rashmi Subbanna as Huli Veeraiah Sister ( Avinash Sister)
Ravishankar Gowda as Rukmini's husband
Sathyabhama as Gowramma, Radha's grandmother
Tota Roy Chowdhury
Srinivasa Gowda as V. Govind, a Police constable
Vanishree as Dr. Sudha
Girish Shivanna as Muniyyappa, a thief
K. V. Manjayya as a priest
Radha Ramachandra as Santosh's grandmother
Prashant Raj in a cameo appearance as a fortune-teller

Production
Terming the film a romcom with a "cute love story", director Prashant Raj stated that the film was named after the orange fruit because it "plays a major role in the film". He added that the protagonists in the film meet because of it. He added that Ganesh who plays the lead role in the film, plays a thief, while Sadhu Kokila plays a wrestler called Undertaker.

The film was Raj and Ganesh's second collaboration after Zoom (2016). Filming began in early February 2018 and later that month Priya Anand was signed to play the female lead opposite Ganesh. In July 2018, a ten-day schedule involving three songs and "montage scenes" were filmed in Europe.

Soundtrack

Music composer S. Thaman was finalized to compose the songs for the film even though initially Joshua Sridhar was considered. Thaman had previously collaborated with Prashant Raj's previous venture Zoom (2016). A single track of the film was released first on 25 October 2018 online. The lyrics for the songs have been written by Kaviraj and Prashant Raj.

Reception
S. M. Shashiprasad of Deccan Chronicle stated "Though predictable, the escapades of misplaced romantic scenario, runs swift without any delay which is another reason to grab this Orange filled with decent humour for the weekend."

References

External links

Orange on The A.V. Club

Indian romantic comedy films
2018 romantic comedy films
2018 masala films
2010s Kannada-language films
Films scored by Thaman S
Films shot in Europe
Films shot in Bangalore
Films directed by Prashant Raj